MasterChef Celebrity Thailand is the Thai version of the competitive reality TV series MasterChef which premiered on Channel 7 on October 3, 2021.

Celebrities

Elimination table

References

MasterChef Thailand
2021 Thai television seasons